Paula Dockery (born June 6, 1961) is an independent politician from the U.S. state of Florida. She served as a member of the Florida Senate for ten years, representing parts of Central Florida from 2002 to 2012 as a Republican. Previously, she served three terms in the Florida House of Representatives, representing a Lakeland-based district from 1996 until her election to the Senate. In January 2017, she left the Republican Party and became an independent.

Early life 
Dockery was born Paula Louise Bono in Queens, New York, on June 6, 1961. Her family moved to Florida in 1968, and she graduated from Coral Springs High School in 1979. She earned a Bachelor of Arts degree in political science from the University of Florida in 1983. While at UF, she was a member of Student Senate, served on the O'Connell Center Board of Managers, Chaired the Affairs & Ethics Committee, and was a graduate teaching assistant.

In 1985 she married Mark Fisher, an aide to United States Senator Lawton Chiles, a Democrat, and in 1986 the couple moved to Lakeland, Florida. She finished her Master of Arts degree in mass communications during 1987, divorced her first husband in 1988, and decided to become active in Republican politics. She was introduced to and married C.C. (Doc) Dockery, a Lakeland businessman and GOP fundraiser, in November 1989. The family business was citrus and cattle.

State legislature 
Dockery was elected to the Florida House of Representatives in 1996, and served three terms. She served as majority whip from 1998 through 2000, and was the primary sponsor of the popular Florida Forever Act.

In 2002, she ran for the Florida Senate, and was elected to a district encompassing northern Polk County and parts of surrounding Osceola, Lake, Sumter, and Hernando Counties. She served as Majority Whip from 2002 until 2004. Dockery chaired the Environmental Protection Committee and the Criminal Justice Committee. She was term limited in 2012 and could not run for re-election.

2010 gubernatorial campaign 

On June 1, 2009, there was a draft campaign to see Senator Dockery run for Governor of Florida.
On November 4, 2009, Dockery entered the race for Florida governor, challenging Florida's Attorney General Bill McCollum for the Republican Nomination.  Dockery dropped out of the race when it became clear that she would be unable to run a competitive campaign against Rick Scott, who spent nearly $50 million of his own money to secure a bitterly fought Republican primary victory.

After Scott's primary win, Dockery's name was floated as a potential running mate for Scott.
On 30 August 2010, Dockery announced that she would not run for lieutenant governor at Scott's side.

Chronicle 
Term limits prohibited Dockery from running for senate re-election in 2012, so when she was asked to write a column for the political discourse website Florida Voices to share her insights of Florida politics during her last year as a senator, she agreed.

Honors and awards

References

External links
Florida State Legislature - Senator Paula Dockery official government website
People for Paula official campaign website
Project Vote Smart - Senator Paula B. Dockery (FL) profile
Follow the Money – Paula Dockery
2006 2004 2002 2000 1998 campaign contributions
- Draft Campaign Web Site

Florida state senators
Members of the Florida House of Representatives
1961 births
Living people
Florida Republicans
University of Florida College of Liberal Arts and Sciences alumni
Women state legislators in Florida
Politicians from Queens, New York
Florida Independents
21st-century American women